The 2011 Tercera División play-offs to Segunda División B from Tercera División (Promotion play-offs) were the final playoffs for the promotion from 2010–11 Tercera División to 2011–12 Segunda División B. The first four teams in each group took part in the play-off.

Format

The eighteen group winners had the opportunity to be promoted directly to Segunda División B. The eighteen group winners were drawn into a two-legged series where the nine winners promoted to Segunda División B. The nine losing clubs entered the play-off round for the last nine promotion spots.

The eighteen runners-up were drawn against one of the seventeen fourth-placed clubs outside their group and the eighteen third-placed clubs were drawn against one another in a two-legged series. The twenty-seven winners advanced with the nine losing clubs from the champions' series to determine the eighteen teams that entered the last two-legged series for the last nine promotion spots. In all the playoff series, the lower-ranked club played at home first. Whenever there was a tie in position (e.g. like the group winners in the champions' series or the third-placed teams in the first round), a draw determined the club to play at home first.

Teams for 2010–11 play-offs

All groups as 38 of 38 rounds.
The teams highlighted in yellow played the play-offs to Segunda División B.
The teams highlighted in red were relegated to Divisiones Regionales.

Eliminatories
The regular season ended on 15 May 2011.
The draw of play-offs were held in the RFEF headquarters on 16 May at 17:00. (CEST+2).
The play-offs began on 21 May and will end on 26 June 2011.

1st eliminatory
For group champions only.

Times are UTC+02:00

Promoted to Segunda División B: Marino de Luanco, Villanovense, Valencia Mestalla, Burgos, Amorebieta, Toledo, Llagostera, Andorra and Linense.
Losers:Costa Cálida, Comarca de Níjar, Alcobendas Sport, Lanzarote, Manacor, Náxara, Cerceda, Noja and Tudelano, continue in the 2nd eliminatory

1st eliminatory (2nd, 3rd and 4th of group)
For 2nd, 3rd and 4th of group only. 2nds played against 4ths and 3rds played against each other.

Times are UTC+02:00

2nd eliminatory
Winners of 1st eliminatory (2nd, 3rd and 4th of group) (27 teams) and losers of 1st eliminatory (1st of group) (9 teams).

Times are UTC+02:00

3rd eliminatory
Winners of 2nd eliminatory.

Times are UTC+02:00

Promoted to Segunda División B:Reus Deportiu, Olímpic Xàtiva, Manacor, Sp. Villanueva, Arandina, S.S. Reyes, Sestao River, Gimn. Segoviana and La Roda

See also
2011 Segunda División play-offs
2010–11 Segunda División play-off

Notes

External links
Futbolme.com

3
Play
Tercera División play-offs